This is part of Finnish exonyms for places in Norway, a list of Finnish language names in Norway. It contains Finnish or Kven names from Finnmark county (Finnish: Ruija), that are officially recognised by the Norwegian Mapping and Cadastre Authority. 

Kven is closely related to Finnish and was recognised as an official minority language of Norway in 2005. It is one of three official languages of Porsanger municipality in Finnmark.

See also

Finnish exonyms
List of European exonyms

Finnish language
Kven culture
Names of places in Norway
Finnish exonyms in Norway: Finnmark